Aggrecanases are extracellular proteolytic enzymes that are members of the ADAMTS (A Disintegrin And Metalloprotease with Thrombospondin Motifs) family. Aggrecanases act on large proteoglycans known as aggrecans, which are components of connective tissues such as cartilage. The inappropriate activity of aggrecanase is a mechanism by which cartilage degradation occurs in diseases such as arthritis. At least two forms of aggrecanase exist in humans: ADAMTS4 or aggrecanase-1 and ADAMTS5 or aggrecanase-2. Both proteins contain thrombospondin (TS) motifs required for proper recognition of substrates. Although both proteins can cleave the substrate aggrecan at the same position, they differ in kinetics and in secondary cleavage sites.

References

ADAMTS
EC 3.4.24